Events in the year 1823 in Art.

Works

 John Constable - Salisbury Cathedral from the Bishop's Grounds
 Eugène Delacroix
 Head of a Woman
 Orphan Girl at the Cemetery (c. 1823 or 1824)
 Caspar David Friedrich - Hutten's Grave
 Francesco Hayez
 Antonietta Vitali Sola
 Conte Ninni
 The Last Kiss of Romeo and Juliet
 George Hayter – The Trial of Queen Caroline
 James Arthur O'Connor – View of Irishtown from Sandymount
 Rembrandt Peale – approximate date
 DeWitt Clinton
 Washington Before Yorktown
 Gilbert Stuart – Portrait of John Adams (Museum of Fine Arts, Boston)
 J. M. W. Turner – Childe Harold's Pilgrimage
 Ferdinand Waldmüller – Portrait of Ludwig van Beethoven

Births
March 1 – Charles Callahan Perkins, American art critic and author (died 1886)
March 31 – William Hart, Scottish-born American landscape painter (died 1894)
May 9 – Thomas Dalziel, English engraver (died 1906)
August 8 – Théodule Ribot, French realist painter (died 1891)
September 28 – Alexandre Cabanel, French painter (died 1889)
December 23 – Jozef Van Lerius, Belgian romantic-historical painter (died 1876)

Deaths
January/February – George Brookshaw, English painter and illustrator (born 1751)
January 22 – John Julius Angerstein, Russian-born British art collector (born c. 1732)
January 25 – Johann Heinrich Bleuler, Swiss painter (born 1758)
February 3 – Étienne-Pierre-Adrien Gois, French sculptor (born 1731)
February 16 – Pierre-Paul Prud'hon, French painter (born 1758)
March 15 – Jean-Louis Anselin, French engraver (born 1754)
March 20 – Grigory Ugryumov, Russian painter (born 1764)
April 23 – Joseph Nollekens, British sculptor (born 1737)
July 8 – Sir Henry Raeburn, Scottish portrait painter (born 1756)
August 9 – Johan Erik Hedberg, Finnish painter (born 1767)
October 21 – Aleksander Lauréus, Finnish painter (born 1783)
December 4 – Luigi Acquisti, Italian sculptor mainly known for his works in the neoclassical style (born 1745)
December 30 – Claude André Deseine, French sculptor (born 1740)
 date unknown – Thomas Pardoe, English enameller noted for flower painting (born 1770)

References

 
Years of the 19th century in art
1820s in art